Eero Laine may refer to:

 Eero Laine (biathlete) (1926–1998), Finnish Olympic biathlete
 Eero Laine (rower) (born 1933), Finnish Olympic rower